Japanese multimedia artist, singer and songwriter Yoko Ono has released 14 studio albums, eight collaborative albums, and 40 singles as a lead artist. Married to English singer-songwriter and the Beatles member John Lennon until his murder in 1980, she has contributed several B-sides to his singles from late 1960s to the 1980s. Ono released her debut studio album Yoko Ono/Plastic Ono Band in December 1970, faring poorly in the United States. Similar moderate success was achieved with her follow-up records Fly (1971) and Approximately Infinite Universe (1973). 

Simultaneously, she released several collaborative albums with Lennon, starting with their Unfinished Music series spawning Two Virgins (1968) and Life with the Lions (1969). Double Fantasy, released three weeks prior to Lennon's murder in 1980, went on to gain widespread commercial success worldwide, topping the charts in the United Kingdom and the United States, among others. Apart from winning the 1981 Album of the Year award at the 24th Annual Grammy Awards, it was certified platinum by the British Phonographic Industry (BPI) and triple platinum by the Recording Industry Association of America (RIAA). Another album with Lennon, Milk and Honey, would be posthumously made available in 1984.

Ono released her fifth studio album Season of Glass in 1981, to moderate success in Norway, Sweden, the United Kingdom and the United States. The same year saw the single "Walking on Thin Ice" reaching number 58 on the US Billboard Hot 100; it marked Ono's first single to reach a major ranking and further peaked within the top 40 on the UK Singles Chart. Starting with 2001, the singer began re-releasing several remixes of her or Lennon's old material as singles, alongside new original songs. She has since then reached number one 13 times on Billboard Dance Club Songs component chart, the last one being in 2017 with "Hell in Paradise 2016". In December 2016, Billboard named Ono the 11th most successful dance club artist of all time.

Albums

Studio albums

Collaborative albums

Other albums

Live albums

Compilation albums

Remix albums

Soundtrack album

Tribute albums

Extended plays

Singles

As lead artist

Other appearances

Guest appearances

Songwriting contributions

Music videos
 "Mrs. Lennon" (1971)
 "Mind Train" (1972)
 "Don't Count the Waves" (1972)
 "Midsummer New York" (1972)
 "Walking on Thin Ice" (1981)
 "No, No, No" (1981)
 "Goodbye Sadness" (1981)
 "My Man" (1982)
 "Hell in Paradise" (1985)
 "New York Woman" (1996)
 "Bad Dancer" (2013)

Notes

References

Discography
Discographies of Japanese artists